Kenzingen is a town in the district of Emmendingen, in Baden-Württemberg, Germany. It is situated on the river Elz, 23 km north of Freiburg.

References

External links
 Kenzingen: pictures

Emmendingen (district)